The 1982–83 Wake Forest Demon Deacons men's basketball team represented Wake Forest University. Led by head coach Carl Tacy, the team finished the season with an overall record of 20-12 (7-7 ACC) and reached the semifinals of the 1983 National Invitation Tournament.

Roster

Schedule and results

References 

Wake Forest Demon Deacons men's basketball seasons
Wake Forest
Wake Forest
1982 in sports in North Carolina
1983 in sports in North Carolina